The International Justice Network (IJNetwork) is a non-profit organization dedicated to protection of human rights and the rule of law throughout the world. They provide direct legal assistance to victims of human rights abuses through a global network of legal professionals, non-governmental organizations and other human rights advocates.

IJNetwork is currently the only organization representing detainees at the Bagram Theater Internment Facility located in the U.S. Bagram Airbase in Afghanistan. 

The IJNetwork has numerous other projects, including assisting the Namibia magistrate and tribal court systems to establish a uniform open source software database of decisions issued by those courts.

See also
International Commission of Jurists

External links 
IJnetwork.org 
Commondreams.org
ABCnews.go.com
USA Today: Detained journalist sues Bush administration

Human rights organizations based in the United States